Robert D'Alvise (born December 23, 1952) is a Canadian former professional ice hockey player.

Early life 
D'Alvise was born in Etobicoke. As a youth, he played in the 1965 Quebec International Pee-Wee Hockey Tournament with the Toronto Faustina minor ice hockey team.

Career 
During the 1975–76 season, D'Alvise played 59 games in the World Hockey Association with the Toronto Toros.

Personal life 
His brother is Dan D'Alvise, who represented Canada at the 1980 Winter Olympics.

Awards and honors

References

External links

1952 births
Living people
AHCA Division I men's ice hockey All-Americans
Buffalo Norsemen players
Canadian ice hockey centres
Charlotte Checkers (SHL) players
Michigan Tech Huskies men's ice hockey players
Sportspeople from Etobicoke
Ice hockey people from Toronto
Toronto Toros players
NCAA men's ice hockey national champions